Pietro Novelli (March 2, 1603 – August 27, 1647) was an Italian painter of the Baroque period, active mainly in Palermo. Also known as il Monrealese or Pietro "Malta" Novelli to distinguish him from his father, Pietro Antonio Novelli I. He was also nicknamed by contemporaries as the Raphael of Sicily.

Biography
He was born in Monreale, and died in Palermo. He initially trained with his father, a painter and mosaicist. His father died in 1625 from the bubonic plague.

As a young apprentice he was a fellow pupil with Gerardo Asturino.  In 1618, he moved to Palermo and apprenticed with Vito Carrera (1555–1623). His first dated work is from 1626: St. Anthony Abbot for the church of Sant'Antonio Abate in Palermo. The development of his style owed much to Anthony van Dyck, who visited Sicily in 1624 and whose altarpiece, the Madonna of the Rosary in the oratory of Santa Maria del Rosario in Palermo was highly influential for local artists. He was also commissioned works and paintings for many churches in Piana degli Albanesi, and various works to adorn the villas of the Sicilian nobility. Other influences on Novelli were the Caravaggisti or tenebrists active in Naples (for example, Ribera). Novelli also painted for the church of Santa Zita in Monreale, and painted a Marriage of Cana for the refectory of the Benedictines in Monreale.

He was injured during the revolution in Palermo in 1647, and died from his wounds. His pupils included Andrea Carreca, Francesco Maggiotto, Francesco Giselli, Michele Blasco, Vincenzo Marchese, Giacomo lo Verde, and Macri da Girgenti. He was also an architect and stage set designer.

Gallery

References

 Grove Encyclopedia entry
Getty Guide biography
 Cain and Abel at web gallery of Art

1603 births
1647 deaths
People from Monreale
17th-century Italian painters
Italian male painters
Painters from Palermo
Italian Baroque painters
Burials at San Domenico, Palermo